Toora was a railway station on the South Gippsland line in South Gippsland, Victoria. The station was opened during the 1890s and operated until the line was closed in 1991, at the same time the line to Barry Beach servicing the oil fields in Bass Strait was closed. The line was dismantled and turned into the Great Southern Rail Trail.

See also
 Toora

References

Disused railway stations in Victoria (Australia)
Transport in Gippsland (region)
Shire of South Gippsland